Events in the year 1899 in Brazil.

Incumbents

Federal government
President: Manuel Ferraz de Campos Sales
Vice President: Francisco de Assis Rosa e Silva

Governors 
 : Manuel Jose Duarte (until 17 June), Francisco Manuel dos Santos (starting 17 June)
 Amazonas: José Cardoso Ramalho Júnior
 Bahia: Luís Viana
 Ceará: Antônio Nogueira Accioli
 : Urbano Coelho de Gouveia
 Maranhão: João Gualberto Torreão da Costa
 Mato Grosso: Antônio Cesário de Figueiredo (until 4 July); João Pedro Xavier Câmara; Antônio Leite de Figueiredo; Antônio Pedro Alves de Barros (from 15 August)
 Minas Gerais: Silviano Brandão
 : Pais de Carvalho
 : Antônio Alfredo Mello
 Paraná: Santos Andrade; then José Bernardino Bormann; then Santos Andrade
 : Joaquim Correia de Araújo (until 4 April); Sigismundo Antônio Gonçalves (from 4 April)
 : Raimundo Artur de Vasconcelos
 Rio Grande do Norte: Joaquim Ferreira Chaves
 Rio Grande do Sul: Antônio Augusto Borges de Medeiros
 :
 Lista de Governadores de São Paulo: 
 :

Vice governors 
 :
 :

Events
13 May - Esporte Clube Vitória is founded in Salvador, Bahia.
14 July - Luis Gálvez Rodríguez de Arias proclaims the First Republic of Acre, breaching the terms of the Treaty of Ayacucho between Brazil and Bolivia.

Literature
Joaquim Maria Machado de Assis - Dom Casmurro

Births
1 January - Nonô (footballer) (died 1931)
3 February - Café Filho, politician (died 1970)
16 June - Dante Milano, modernist poet (died 1991)
19 June - Antonio dos Reis Carneiro, basketball administrator (date of death unknown)
3 October - Artur da Costa e Silva, President 1967-1969 (died 1969)
23 November - Manuel dos Reis Machado, master practitioner of capoeira (died 1974)

Deaths
25 January - Alfredo Maria Adriano d'Escragnolle Taunay, Viscount of Taunay, writer, musician, professor, military engineer, historian and politician (born 1843)
13 November - José Ferraz de Almeida Júnior, painter (born 1850; murdered)

References

External links

 
1890s in Brazil
Years of the 19th century in Brazil
Brazil
Brazil